Sabine High School is a public high school located in the unincorporated community of Liberty City, Texas, in Gregg County, United States and classified as a 3A school by the UIL.  It is a part of the Sabine Independent School District located in western Gregg County and is addressed to neighboring Gladewater.  In 2013, the school was rated "Met Standard" by the Texas Education Agency.

Athletics
The Sabine Cardinals compete in these sports 

Volleyball, Cross Country, Football, Basketball, Powerlifting, Golf, Tennis, Track, Baseball & Softball

In 2014, the football team made the playoffs for the 1st time since 1985.

State Titles
Boys Basketball 
1980(1A), 1981(1A)
Boys Golf 
1961(B), 1962(B), 1963(B)

References

External links
Sabine ISD website

Public high schools in Texas
Schools in Gregg County, Texas